The following lists events that happened during 1860 in New Zealand.

Incumbents

Regal and viceregal
Head of State — Queen Victoria
Governor — Colonel Thomas Gore Browne leaves office on 3 October to take up the post of Governor of Tasmania. His successor is Sir George Grey who takes up the position in December.

Government and law
The general election of 1860–1861 begins on 12 December but does not conclude until 28 March the following year. The 2nd Parliament continues until the completion of the election.

Speaker of the House — The sitting Speaker, Sir Charles Clifford, does not stand for re-election. He will be replaced in 1861 by Sir David Monro.
Premier — Edward Stafford.
Minister of Finance — William Richmond.
Chief Justice — Hon George Arney

Events
 2 January: The Auckland Independent ceases publishing. It began in 1859.
 6 January: The Marlborough Press publishes its first issue. The paper continues until 1948.
 8 January: Julius von Haast begins his journey of exploration of the West Coast.
 17 March: The assault on Te Kohia pā marks the beginning of the First Taranaki War.
 28 March: Battle of Waireka.
 27 June: The battle of Puketakauere is a major setback for Imperial forces.
 28 December: Imperial forces capture Matarikoriko Pā, near Waitara.
Undated
The Nelson Advertiser is a short-lived newspaper in the Nelson, New Zealand area.

Arts and literature

Music
A choral society is formed in Wellington.
The Canterbury Vocal Union is formed by nine men in Christchurch. It shortly afterwards merges with the St. Cecilia Society and will eventually become the Royal Christchurch Music Society.

Sport

Cricket
The first inter-provincial cricket game is played between Auckland and Wellington. Auckland win.

Horse racing
The New Zealand Derby is held for the first time, at Riccarton Racecourse. This is the first race in New Zealand to have a continuous annual history.

Major race winner
New Zealand Derby – Ada

Lawn bowls
Bowls is first known to have been played in the country, in Auckland.

Rowing

Shooting
The Government recommends that prizes be given for rifle shooting. This leads to the
first National Rifle Shooting Championships in 1861.

Births
 11 September: James Allan, rugby union player

Deaths
 8 January: Louis Catherin Servant, Catholic priest and missionary
 30 May: Karetai, tribal leader
 25 June: Pōtatau Te Wherowhero, first Māori King
 6 August: William Cargill, British soldier, Otago founder and politician
 7 August: Charles Southwell, English-born journalist, freethinker and newspaper publisher
 4 November (in Tianjin, China): Arthur Saunders Thomson, military surgeon, medical scientist, writer and historian
 26 December: Barnet Burns, English sailor and trader

Unknown date
Te Rei Hanataua, tribal leader

See also
List of years in New Zealand
Timeline of New Zealand history
History of New Zealand
Military history of New Zealand
Timeline of the New Zealand environment
Timeline of New Zealand's links with Antarctica

References
General
 Romanos, J. (2001) New Zealand Sporting Records and Lists. Auckland: Hodder Moa Beckett. 
Specific

External links